The First Marlin cabinet was the fifth Cabinet of Sint Maarten installed following the achievement of constituent country status of Sint Maarten within the Kingdom of the Netherlands on 10 October 2010. The cabinet was a coalition between the National Alliance, Democratic Party, United St. Maarten Party and independent members of Parliament Maurice Lake and Silvio Matser.

Composition
The cabinet is composed as follows:

|Prime Minister
|William Marlin
|NA
|19 November 2015
|-
|rowspan="2"|Minister of Housing, Physical Planning, and Environment
|William Marlin (interim)
|NA
|19 November 2015
|-
|Angel Meyers
|
|27 November 2015
|-
|Minister of Finance
|Richard Gibson
|NA
|19 November 2015
|-
|rowspan="2"|Minister of Justice
|Richard Gibson (interim)
|NA
|19 November 2015
|-
|Edson Kirindongo
|USP
|26 January 2016
|-
|Minister of Tourism, Economic Affairs, Transport and Telecommunications
|Irania Arrindell
|
|19 November 2015
|-
|Minister of Healthcare, Social Development, and Labor
|Emil Lee
| DP
||19 November 2015
|-
|Minister of Education, Culture, Youth, and Sports
|Silveria Jacobs
|NA
||19 November 2015
|-
|Minister Plenipotentiary of Sint Maarten
|Henrietta Doran-York
|NA
||19 November 2015
|}

 Angel Meyers was put forward on Maurice Lake's recommendation, while 	Irania Arrindell was recommended by Silvio Matser.

References

Marlin I
2015 establishments in Sint Maarten
Cabinets established in 2015
2016 disestablishments in Sint Maarten
Cabinets disestablished in 2016